The Church of the Acheiropoietos is a 5th-century Byzantine church in the northern Greek city of Thessaloniki, Central Macedonia. It is located in the city's centre, at Agias Sofias street opposite Makedonomachon square. Because of its outstanding early Byzantine architecture, the church was inscribed on the UNESCO World Heritage List in 1988 along with other Paleochristian and Byzantine monuments of Thessaloniki.

History and description 
The Acheiropoietos has been dated from its bricks and mosaics to ca. 450–470, making it perhaps the earliest of the city's surviving churches. It was modified in the 7th and again in the 14th–15th centuries. Known as the Panagia Theotokos in Byzantine times, it is dedicated to Mary. Its current name is first attested in 1320, presumably after a miraculous acheiropoietos ("not made by hands") icon of Panagia Hodegetria that was housed there. Byzantine sources also indicate that the cult of the city's patron saint, Saint Demetrius, was also practised there.

The building is a three-aisled basilica, some 28 m wide and 36.5 m long, with a wooden roof. Its eastern end is a semicircular vault, while on the western side a narthex, flanked by towers, and traces of an exonarthex survive. The three aisles are separated by columns, while the two side aisles have galleries above them. At the eastern end of the northern side aisle, a middle Byzantine chapel dedicated to St. Irene is attached. On the northwestern corner of the basilica, the stairway leading to the galleries survives. The current entrance is through a triple-arched opening (tribelon) that connects the narthex with the main nave, while on the southern side there is a monumental entranceway, which probably connected the church with the city's Byzantine-era thoroughfare. Another small adjoining building on the south side has been identified as the church's baptistery. The modern roof is lower than the original, where the section above the central nave was elevated to allow light in.

The surviving parts of the church's rich original interior decoration include particularly fine 5th-century Ionian capitals from a Constantinopolitan workshop, the green Thessalian marble columns of the tribelon, the original Proconnesian marble pavement of the central nave, and fragments of 5th-century decorative mosaics. Fine but damaged early 13th-century frescoes depicting the Forty Martyrs of Sebaste adorn the southern side. Underneath the north aisle's current pavement, three layers of floor mosaics from an earlier Roman-era bath have been uncovered.

After Ottoman conquest of the city in 1430, the Acheiropoietos was the first church to be converted into a mosque, by Sultan Murad II himself. Throughout the Ottoman period, it remained the city's principal mosque under the name Eski Camii ("Old Mosque"). An inscription by Murad survives in the northern colonnade, on the eighth column from the east.

Gallery

References

Further reading 

Weitzmann, Kurt, ed., Age of spirituality: late antique and early Christian art, third to seventh century, no. 587, 1979, Metropolitan Museum of Art, New York, 

Acheiropoietos
World Heritage Sites in Greece
Acheiropoietos
Acheiropoietos
Christianity in Roman Macedonia
Acheiropoietos
Acheiropoietos
Acheiropoietos
Roman Thessalonica